Wilson Bikram Rai is a Nepalese comedian, actor, singer, dancer and film producer.
He played the role as Takme Buda on NTV sitcom Meri Bassai (2012–2015). Now he is featuring in the comedy web series Khas Khus.  He often imitates the retired ex-British Gurkha army Kirat Kirat accent as 'Takme Buda' to entertain his spectators. He is also the brand ambassador of Italian shoes Black Horse.

Early life
Wilson Bikram Rai was born in Birtamod, Jhapa Nepal where his father and sister still resides. He studied in Little Flowers' English School in Anarmani 4 Jhapa Nepal. His mother Mrs Kamala Rai died when he was 9 years old.

Career

Playback singing
He is active in singing, his songs include:
 Twinkle Twinkle Little Star
 Pani Pani Pani Jindagani
 19 Fauntin youdda Ladhda Pako Mailey Takma
 I Love You Santaram
 Chanuwa Mitho
 Jhyana pultung

Acting 
He is known for his role as Takme Buda in Meri Bassai. Before his current role, he hosted a comedy show channel on YouTube, titled The Wilson Bikram Show. He has acted in a number of music videos including:
 Adrian Pradhan's Khairo Khairo Kapal Timro
 Prakash Poudel's Haa Haa Haa
 Parbati Rai's Jhajhalko Aai Rahancha Barai
 Kumar Dumi Rai's Soi Dhole Soi

Filmography

Rai has featured in a number of Nepalese films and Tele-Series.

References

People from Jhapa District
21st-century Nepalese male actors
Year of birth missing (living people)
Nepalese male child actors
Nepalese male comedians
Rai people